Meleneta is a genus of moths of the family Noctuidae.

Species
Meleneta antennata J. B. Smith, 1908

References
Meleneta at funet

Pantheinae